Micky Papa (born August 31, 1990) is a Canadian skateboarder, competing in the street discipline. Papa currently resides in Van Nuys, California.

Career
At the 2021 Street Skateboarding World Championships Papa finished in eighth.

In June 2021, Papa was named to Canada's 2020 Olympic team, in the inaugural skateboarding competition. Papa competed in the Tokyo 2020 Olympics Men's Street competition, placing 10th in the semifinal round, not advancing to the finals.

References

External links
 We Forget - Micky Papa full part - Thrasher magazine - 2015
 Papa: How Skateboarding Saved My Life - The Berrics -  2021
 Dragons TV kicks it with Micky Papa - 2022

1990 births
Canadian skateboarders
Living people
Olympic skateboarders of Canada
Sportspeople from Burnaby
Skateboarders at the 2020 Summer Olympics